Storks are large, long-legged, long-necked wading birds with long, stout bills. They belong to the family called Ciconiidae, and make up the order Ciconiiformes . Ciconiiformes previously included a number of other families, such as herons and ibises, but those families have been moved to other orders.

Storks dwell in many regions and tend to live in drier habitats than the closely related herons, spoonbills and ibises; they also lack the powder down that those groups use to clean off fish slime. Bill-clattering is an important mode of communication at the nest. Many species are migratory. Most storks eat frogs, fish, insects, earthworms, small birds and small mammals. There are 19 living species of storks in six genera.

Various terms are used to refer to groups of storks, two frequently used ones being a muster of storks and a phalanx of storks.

Storks tend to use soaring, gliding flight, which conserves energy. Soaring requires thermal air currents. Ottomar Anschütz's famous 1884 album of photographs of storks inspired the design of Otto Lilienthal's experimental gliders of the late nineteenth century.

Their nests are often very large and may be used for many years. All storks were once thought to be monogamous, but this is only partially true. Some species may change mates after migrations, and may migrate without a mate.

Storks' large size, serial monogamy, and faithfulness to an established nesting site contribute to their prominence in mythology and culture.

Morphology

Their shape is superficially similar to the herons, with long legs and necks, but they are more heavy-set. There is some sexual dimorphism (differences between males and females) in size, with males being up to 15% bigger than females in some species (for example the saddle-billed stork), but almost no difference in appearance. The only difference is in the colour of the iris of the two species in the genus Ephippiorhynchus.

The bills of storks are large to very large, and vary considerably between the genera. The shape of the bills is linked to the diet of the different species. The large bills of the Ciconia storks are the least specialised. Larger are the massive and slightly upturned bills of the Ephippiorhynchus and the jabiru. These have evolved to hunt for fish in shallow water. Larger still are the massive daggers of the two adjutants and marabou (Leptoptilos), which are used to feed on carrion and in defence against other scavengers, as well as for taking other prey. The long, ibis-like downcurved bills of the Mycteria storks have sensitive tips that allow them to detect prey by touch (tactilocation) where cloudy conditions would not allow them to see it. The most specialised bills of any storks are those of the two openbills (Anastomus.), which as their name suggested is open in the middle when their bill is closed. These bills have evolved to help openbills feed on their only prey item, aquatic snails.

Although it is sometimes reported that storks lack syrinxes and are mute, they do have syrinxes, and are capable of making some sounds, although they do not do so often.  The syrinxes of storks are "variably degenerate" however, and the syringeal membranes of some species are found between tracheal rings or cartilage, an unusual arrangement shared with the ovenbirds.

Distribution and habitat

Storks have a nearly cosmopolitan distribution, being absent from the poles, most of North America and large parts of Australia. The centres of stork diversity are in tropical Asia and sub-Saharan Africa, with eight and six breeding species respectively. Just three species are present in the New World: wood stork, maguari stork and jabiru, which is the tallest flying bird of the Americas. Two species, white and black stork, reach Europe and western temperate Asia, while one species, Oriental stork, reaches temperate areas of eastern Asia, and one species, black-necked stork, is found in Australasia.

Storks are more diverse and common in the tropics, and the species that live in temperate climates for the most part migrate to avoid the worst of winter. They are fairly diverse in their habitat requirements. Some species, particularly the Mycteria  "wood storks" and Anastomus openbills, are highly dependent on water and aquatic prey, but many other species are far less dependent on this habitat type, although they will frequently make use of it. Species like the marabou and Abdim's stork will frequently be found foraging in open grasslands of savannah. Preferred habitats include flooded grasslands, light woodland, marshes and paddyfields, wet meadows, river backwaters and ponds. Many species will select shallow pools, particularly when lakes or rivers are drying out, as they concentrate prey and make it harder for prey to escape, or when monsoonal rainfall increases water depth of larger waterbodies. Some species like the woolly-necked storks and lesser adjutant storks have adapted to changing crops of tropical agricultural landscapes showcasing behavioral plasticity that enables them to remain resident despite the transformations brought about by seasonal crops. In South Africa, the woolly-necked storks have adapted to artificial feeding and now largely nest on trees in gardens with swimming pools.

Less typical habitats include the dense temperate forests used by European black storks, or the rainforest habitat sought by Storm's stork in South East Asia. They generally avoid marine habitats, with the exception of the lesser adjutant, milky stork and wood stork, all of which forage in mangroves, lagoons and estuarine mudflats. A  number of species, especially woolly-necked storks, black-necked storks, Asian openbills and lesser adjutant Storks in south Asia, have adapted to highly modified human habitats, either for foraging or breeding or both. In the absence of persecution several species breed close to people, and species such as the marabou, greater adjutant, and white stork will feed at landfill sites.

Migration and movements

Storks vary in their tendency towards migration. Temperate species like the white stork, black stork and Oriental stork undertake long annual migrations in the winter. The routes taken by these species have developed to avoid long distance travel across water, and from Europe this usually means flying across the Straits of Gibraltar or east across the Bosphorus and through Israel and the Sinai. Studies of young birds denied the chance to travel with others of their species have shown that these routes are at least partially learnt, rather than being innate as they are in passerine migrants. Migrating black storks are split between those that make stopovers on the migration between Europe and their wintering grounds in Africa, and those that don't.

The Abdim's stork is another migrant, albeit one that migrates within the tropics. It breeds in northern Africa, from Senegal to the Red Sea, during the wet season, and then migrates to Southern Africa. Many species that aren't regular migrants will still make smaller movements if circumstances require it; others may migrate over part of their range. This can also include regular commutes from nesting sites to feeding areas. Wood storks have been observed feeding  from their breeding colony.

Behaviour

Feeding and diet

Storks are carnivorous predators, taking a range of reptiles, small mammals, insects, fish, amphibians and other small invertebrates. Any plant material consumed is usually by accident. Mycteria storks are specialists in feeding on aquatic vertebrates, particularly when prey is concentrated by lowering water levels or flooding into shallows. On marine mudflats and mangrove swamps in Sumatra, milky storks feed on mudskippers, probing the burrow with the bill and even the whole head into the mud. The characteristic feeding method involves standing or walking in shallow water and holding the bill submerged in the water. When contact is made with prey the bill reflexively snaps shut in 25 milliseconds, one of the fastest reactions known in any vertebrate. The reaction is able to distinguish between prey items and inanimate objects like branches, although the exact mechanism is unknown.

Openbills are specialists in freshwater molluscs, particularly apple snails. They feed in small groups, and sometimes African openbills ride on the backs of hippos while foraging. Having caught a snail it will return to land or at least to the shallows to eat it. The fine tip of the bill of the openbills is used to open the snail, and the saliva has a narcotic effect, which causes the snail to relax and simplifies the process of extraction.

The other genera of storks are more generalised. Ciconia storks are very generalised in their diets, although Abdim's stork is something of a specialist in feeding in large flocks on swarms of locusts and at wildfires, although other storks will opportunistically feed in this way if the opportunity arises. This is why white storks and Abdim's storks are known as "grasshopper birds". Ephippiorhynchus are carnivorous though have a very diverse diet when living on human modified habitats such as agricultural landscapes. The foraging method used by the generalists is to stalk or walk across grassland or shallow water, watching for prey.

Breeding

Storks range from being solitary breeders through loose breeding associations to fully colonial. The jabiru, Ephippiorhynchus storks and several species of Ciconia are entirely solitary when breeding. In contrast the Mycteria storks, Abdim's stork, openbills and Leptoptilos storks all breed in colonies which can range from a couple of pairs to thousands. Many of these species breed in colonies with other waterbirds, which can include other species of storks, herons and egrets, pelicans, cormorants and ibises. White storks, Oriental storks and Maguari storks are all loosely colonial, and may breed in nests that are within visual range of others of the same species, but have little to do with one another. They also may nest solitarily, and the reasons why they choose to nest together or apart are not understood.

Systematics
A DNA study found that the families Ardeidae, Balaenicipitidae, Scopidae and the Threskiornithidae belong to the Pelecaniformes. This would make Ciconiidae the only group.

Storks were distinct and possibly widespread by the Oligocene. Like most families of aquatic birds, storks seem to have arisen in the Palaeogene, maybe 40–50 million years ago (mya). For the fossil record of living genera, documented since the Middle Miocene (about 15 mya) at least in some cases, see the genus articles.

No species or subspecies of stork is known to have gone extinct in historic times. A systematic literature review uncovered nearly 1,000 papers on storks, but showed most stork species to lack scientific understanding suggesting that many species should be classified as Data Deficient on the IUCN Red List. A Ciconia bone found in a rock shelter on the island of Réunion was probably of a bird taken there as food by early settlers; no known account mentions the presence of storks on the Mascarene Islands.

Extant storks

Fossil storks
Genus Palaeoephippiorhynchus (fossil: Early Oligocene of Fayyum, Egypt)
Genus Grallavis (fossil: Early Miocene of Saint-Gérand-le-Puy, France, and Djebel Zelten, Libya) – may be same as Prociconia
Ciconiidae gen. et sp. indet. (Ituzaingó Late Miocene of Paraná, Argentina)
Ciconiidae gen. et sp. indet. (Puerto Madryn Late Miocene of Punta Buenos Aires, Argentina)
Genus Prociconia (fossil: Late Pleistocene of Brazil) – may belong to modern genus Jabiru or Ciconia
Genus Pelargosteon (fossil: Early Pleistocene of Romania)
Ciconiidae gen. et sp. indet. – formerly Aquilavus/Cygnus bilinicus (fossil: Early Miocene of Břešťany, Czech Republic)
cf. Leptoptilos gen. et sp. indet. – formerly L. siwalicensis (fossil: Late Miocene? – Late Pliocene of Siwalik, India)
Ciconiidae gen. et sp. indet. (fossil: Late Pleistocene of San Josecito Cavern, Mexico)

The fossil genera Eociconia (Middle Eocene of China) and Ciconiopsis (Deseado Early Oligocene of Patagonia, Argentina) are often tentatively placed with this family. A "ciconiiform" fossil fragment from the Touro Passo Formation found at Arroio Touro Passo (Rio Grande do Sul, Brazil) might be of the living wood stork M. americana; it is at most of Late Pleistocene age, a few 10,000s of years.

Etymology

The Modern English word can be traced back to Proto-Germanic *sturkaz. Nearly every Germanic language has a descendant of this proto-language word to indicate the (white) stork. Related names also occur in Latvian, stārķis, and some Slavic languages, e.g. štorklja in Slovenian and “щъркел” [shtŭrkel] in Bulgarian, originating as Germanic loanwords.

According to the New Shorter Oxford English Dictionary, the Germanic root is probably related to the modern English "stark", in reference to the stiff or rigid posture of a European species, the white stork. A non-Germanic word linked to it may be Greek torgos ("vulture").

In some West Germanic languages cognate words of a different etymology exist, e.g. ooievaar in Dutch. They originate from *uda-faro, uda being related to water meaning something like swamp or moist area and faro being related to fare; so *uda-faro is something like he who walks in the swamp. In later times this name got reanalysed as *ōdaboro, ōda "fortune, wealth" + boro "bearer" meaning he who brings wealth adding to the myth of storks as maintainers of welfare and bringers of children.

In Estonian, "stork" is toonekurg, which is derived from toonela (underworld in Estonian folklore) + kurg (crane). At the times storks were named, the now-rare black stork was probably the more common species.

In fiction 
Storks have many stories surrounding them, like in Aesop's (6th century BCE) fables The Farmer and the Stork and The Fox and the Stork. The first fable begins with a farmer plowing his fields, sowing his seeds and spreading his nets. These nets catch several cranes who hopped behind him picking up the seed. Along with the cranes tangled in his net, the farmer discovered a stork with a broken leg. The stork begged the farmer to spare his life, arguing that he was not a crane, but a stork. He pointed to his feathers and told the farmer that they didn't resemble a crane's feathers in the least. The farmer laughed at the stork and said, "I have taken you with these robbers, the cranes, and you must die in their company."

A common euphemism is that storks deliver babies to their mothers instead of mothers giving birth.

Storks play a prominent role in Hans Christian Andersen's lengthy fairy tale, "The Marsh King's Daughter."

The Pokemon Bombirdier, introduced in the  9th generation of the series, is based on a stork.

Footnotes

References

External links

 
 
 Scott MacDonald, "The Stork" emblematic uses
 Storks Image documentation
 Stork videos on the Internet Bird Collection
 Whitestork Photos Image documentation
 Storks vocalizing 

 
 
Extant Rupelian first appearances
Taxa named by John Edward Gray

fr:Cigogne